Lianxi Subdistrict is a subdistrict and the seat of Dao County in Hunan, China. The subdistrict is located in the central region of the county, dividing a portion of the former Daojiang Town, it was formed in August 2010.

References

Dao County
County seats in Hunan